Tobias Huss (born December 9, 1966) is an American actor, known for portraying Artie in the Nickelodeon series The Adventures of Pete & Pete (1993–1996). He is also known for his voice-over work on the long-running animated series King of the Hill (1997–2010) as Kahn Souphanousinphone and Cotton Hill, and his role as Felix "Stumpy" Dreifuss on HBO's Carnivàle (2003–2005). He played John Bosworth on the AMC original period drama Halt and Catch Fire.

Early life
Huss was born in Marshalltown, Iowa, to Gerald and Elma Huss. His father was a high school chemistry teacher, and his mother was a cosmetics sales representative. He attended the University of Iowa, where he participated in No Shame Theatre before moving to Los Angeles to pursue an acting career.

Career

In the early 1990s, Huss appeared in network promos for MTV, playing odd characters, including a crooner known at the time as Ol' Two Eyes, who sang lounge-singer versions of Dr. Dre's "Dre Day", Cypress Hill's "Insane in the Brain", Pearl Jam's "Jeremy", and Onyx's hit "Slam"; a James Bond-like spy named Cobalt; a leather fetishist with an abnormal affection for goats; a flannel-wearing doofus; and an angry redneck named Reverend Tex Stoveheadbottom, who delivered fast-talking and descriptively detailed non sequitur tirades that usually included the phrase, "Go to Hell!"

Other roles include the voices of Cotton Hill and Kahn Souphanousinphone on King of the Hill and "the Wiz", a boyfriend of Elaine Benes in the episode "The Junk Mail" of Seinfeld. From his parodies of Frank Sinatra, which were featured in the films Vegas Vacation and Down Periscope, Huss has created a Sinatra-inspired character named Rudy Casoni.

Personal life
Huss is a single father and has one daughter, named Charlotte. In July 2014, Huss sold his home in Highland Park for $850,000.

Filmography

Film

Television

Video games

Web

Discography
S'no Balls (2004)

References

External links

 
 Cinemad Podcast #16: Toby Huss

1966 births
Male actors from Iowa
American male film actors
American male television actors
American male voice actors
Living people
People from Marshalltown, Iowa
University of Iowa alumni
20th-century American male actors
21st-century American male actors